Ngāti Toa, Ngāti Toarangatira or Ngāti Toa Rangatira, is a Māori iwi (tribe) based in the southern North Island and in the northern South Island of New Zealand. Its rohe (tribal area) extends from Whanganui in the north, Palmerston North in the east, and Kaikoura and Hokitika in the south. Ngāti Toa remains a small iwi with a population of only about 4500 (NZ Census 2001). It has four marae: Takapūwāhia and Hongoeka in Porirua City, and Whakatū and Wairau in the north of the South Island. Ngāti Toa's governing body has the name Te Rūnanga o Toa Rangatira.

The iwi traces its descent from the eponymous ancestor Toarangatira. Prior to the 1820s, Ngāti Toa lived on the coastal west Waikato region until forced out by conflict with other Tainui iwi headed by Pōtatau Te Wherowhero ( 1785 - 1860), who later became the first Māori King. Ngāti Toa, Ngāti Rārua and Ngāti Koata, led by Te Rauparaha ( 1765-1849), escaped south and invaded Taranaki and the Wellington regions together with three North Taranaki iwi, Te Āti Awa, Ngāti Tama and Ngāti Mutunga. Together they fought with and conquered the turangawaewae
of Wellington, Ngāti Ira, wiping out their existence as an independent iwi.
After the 1820s, the region conquered by Ngāti Toa extended from Miria-te-kakara at Rangitikei to Wellington, and across Cook Strait to Wairau and Nelson.

Traditional sayings

A saying delineates the tribe's traditional boundaries:

However the tribe mainly lives around Porirua and Nelson. An aphorism links tribal identity with ancestors and landmarks:

History

Origins of the iwi
Tū-pāhau, a descendant of Hoturoa, the captain of the Tainui canoe, received warning of an imminent attack by Tamure, a priest of Tainui, and at once organised a plan of defence and attack.  Tamure had an army of 2000 warriors whereas Tupahau had only 300. Tū-pāhau and his followers won the battle, however Tū-pāhau spared Tamure's life.  Tamure responded to this by saying, Tēnā koe Tupahau, te toa rangatira! meaning "Hail Tū-pāhau the chivalrous warrior!" (toa meaning "brave man" or "champion" and rangatira meaning "gallant", "grand", "admirable" or "chiefly").

Later, Tū-pāhau's daughter-in-law bore a son who received the name "Toa-rangatira" to commemorate both this event and the subsequent peace made between Tamure and Tū-pāhau. Ngāti Toa trace their descent from Toa-rangatira.

Te Rauparaha 

Parekowhatu of Ngāti Raukawa, the wife of Werawera of Ngāti Toa, gave birth to Te Rauparaha in about the 1760s. According to tribal tradition the birth took place at Pātangata near Kāwhia. Te Rauparaha became the foremost chief of Ngāti Toa, credited with leading Ngāti Toa forces against the Waikato and Ngāti Maniapoto iwi and then, after his defeat, with piloting the migration to, and the conquest and settlement of, the Cook Strait region in the 1820s. Later he crossed Cook Strait to attack the Rangitane people in the Wairau valley. His attempt to conquer the southern South Island iwi was thwarted by an outbreak of measles which killed many of his warriors.

Te Rauparaha signed the Treaty of Waitangi twice in May and June 1840: first at Kapiti Island and then again at Wairau. Te Rauparaha resisted European settlement in those areas which he claimed he had not sold. Later disputes occurred over Porirua and the Hutt Valley. But the major clash came in 1843 when Te Rauparaha and his nephew Te Rangihaeata tried to prevent the survey of lands in the Wairau plains.  These lands had been claimed by the New Zealand Company "on two grounds – alleged purchase by Captain Blenkinsop, master of a Sydney whaler in 1831-2; and the negotiations between their principal agent (Colonel Wakefield) and Rauparaha, the head of this tribe, in 1839". Te Rauparaha burnt down a whare which contained survey equipment. The Nelson magistrate ordered his arrest and deputised a number of citizens as police. Te Rauparaha resisted arrest and fighting broke out, resulting in the death of Te Rongo, the wife of Te Rangihaeata. Te Rangihaeata, who was known as a savage warrior, then killed the survey-party, who had surrendered, to avenge his wife's death in an act of utu.  This became known as the Wairau Affray or until modern times, the Wairau massacre, as most of the Europeans were killed after the fighting had stopped.

Following fighting in the Hutt Valley in 1846, Governor George Grey arrested Te Rauparaha after British troops discovered he was receiving and sending secret instructions to the local Maori who were attacking settlers. In a surprise attack on his pa, Te Rauparaha, who was now quite elderly, was captured and taken prisoner of war. The government held him as a prisoner for 10 months and then kept him under house arrest in Auckland on board a prison ship, the Driver. After his capture fighting stopped in the Wellington region. Te Rauparaha was released to attend a Maori peace conference at Kohimaramara in Auckland and then given his liberty after giving up any claim to the Wairau valley. Te Rauparaha's last notable achievement came with the construction of Rangiātea Church (1846) in Ōtaki.  He did not adopt Christianity, although he attended church services.

Te Rauparaha died on 27 November 1849, aged about 85, and was buried near Rangiātea, in Otaki. Many remember him as the author of the haka "Ka mate, ka mate", which he composed after being hidden in a rua (potato pit) by a woman in the Taupo region after a defeat in battle.

Invasion from the north 

Ngāti Toa lived around the Kāwhia region for many generations until increasing conflicts with neighbouring Waikato–Maniapoto iwi forced a withdrawal from their homeland. From the late eighteenth century Ngāti Toa and related tribes constantly warred with the Waikato–Maniapoto tribes for control of the rich fertile land north of Kāwhia. The wars intensified with every killing of a major chief and with each insult and slight suffered, peaking with the huge battle of Hingakaka in the late 18th or early 19th century. Ngāti Toa migrated from Kāwhia to the Cook Strait region under the leadership of their chief Te Rauparaha in the 1820s.

Together, the two migrations Heke Tahutahuahi and Heke Tātaramoa have the name Heke mai raro, meaning "migration from the north". The carved meeting-house bearing the name Te Heke Mai Raro, which stands on Hongoeka Marae, immortalises the migration.

First migration, Heke Tahutahuahi, 1820 

Heke Tahutahuahi (translatable as the "fire lighting expedition") brought the Ngāti Toa iwi out of Kāwhia and into Taranaki in 1820.  The Taranaki iwi Ngāti Mutunga presented Ngāti Toa with Pukewhakamaru Pā, as well as with the cultivations nearby. Pukewhakamaru lay inland of Ōkokī, up the Urenui River. Ngāti Toa stayed at Pukewhakamaru for 12 months.  The Waikato–Maniapoto alliance followed Ngāti Toa to Taranaki and battles ensued there, most notably the battle of Motunui between Waikato–Maniapoto and the Ngāti Tama, Te Āti Awa and Ngāti Mutunga alliance.

Second migration, Heke Tātaramoa, 1822– 

The name Heke Tātaramoa (translatable as the "bramble bush migration") commemorates the difficulties experienced during Ngāti Toa's second migration.  Ngāti Toa left Ōkokī around February–March 1822 after harvesting crops planted for the journey. This heke also included some people from Ngāti Tama, Ngāti Mutunga and Te Āti Awa. The heke arrived in the Horowhenua–Kapiti region in the early 1820s and settled first in Te Awamate, near the mouth of the Rangitīkei River, then at Te Wharangi (now Foxton Beach), at the mouth of the Manawatū River, and then eventually on Kapiti Island.

"Ka Mate" haka 
Concern over inappropriate commercial use of Te Rauparaha's Ka Mate led the iwi to attempt to trademark it, but in 2006 the Intellectual Property Office of New Zealand turned their claim down on the grounds that Ka Mate had achieved wide recognition in New Zealand and abroad as representing New Zealand as a whole and not a particular trader.

In 2009, as a part of a wider settlement of grievances, the New Zealand government agreed to:
...record the authorship and significance of the haka Ka Mate to Ngāti Toa and ... work with Ngāti Toa to address their concerns with the haka... [but] does not expect that redress will result in royalties for the use of Ka Mate or provide Ngāti Toa with a veto on the performance of Ka Mate....

In November2021, tribal elders told anti-Covid-vaccine protesters in New Zealand to stop using the KaMate haka at their rallies.

Marae and wharenui

There are four marae (communal places) and wharenui (meeting houses) affiliated with Ngāti Toa:
 Hongoeka Marae (including Te Heke Mai Raro wharenui), Plimmerton
 Takapuwahia Marae (including Toa Rangatira wharenui), Porirua
 Wairau Marae (including Wairau wharenui), Spring Creek
 Whakatū Marae (including Kākāti wharenui), Nelson

Governance

Te Runanga o Toa Rangatira Inc is recognised by the New Zealand Government as the governance entity of Ngāti Toa following its Treaty of Waitangi settlement with the Crown under Ngāti Toa Rangatira Claims Settlement Act 2014. It is a mandated iwi organisation under the Māori Fisheries Act 2004, an iwi aquaculture organisation under the Māori Commercial Aquaculture Claims Settlement Act 2004, an "iwi authority" under the Resource Management Act, and a Tūhono organisation.

Te Runanga o Toa Rangatira is an incorporated society, governed by a board of 15 representatives, including three elected from iwi whānui, some appointed from Hamilton, Nelson and Wairau, and some appointed from marae and other Ngāti Toa organisations. As of 2016, the iwi chairperson is Taku Parai, the executive director is Matiu Rei, and the society is based in Porirua.

Wellington pan-tribal Māori radio station Te Upoko O Te Ika has been affiliated to Ngāti Toa since 2014. It began part-time broadcasting in 1983 and full-time broadcasting in 1987, and it is New Zealand's longest-running Māori radio station. Atiawa Toa FM is an official radio station of Ngāti Toa and Te Atiawa. It began as Atiawa FM in 1993, broadcasting to Te Atiawa in the Hutt Valley and Wellington. It changed its name in Atiawa Toa FM in mid-1997, expanding its reach to Ngāti Toa in Porirua and Kapiti Coast.

Ngāti Toa have interests in the territories of Greater Wellington Regional Council, Tasman District Council, Nelson City Council and Marlborough District Council. It also has interests in the territories of Kapiti Coast District Council, Porirua City Council and Wellington City Council.

References

External links 
 Ngāti Toa 
 Hongoeka Marae
 Te Rauparaha
 Ngāti Toarangatira in Te Ara – the Encyclopedia of New Zealand
 Haka 'Ka Mate' Performed by Ngāti Toa – video on the Te Papa Channel